Meeravudan Krishna is a 2012 Indian Tamil-language romantic drama film directed by Krishna, who stars in the film alongside Swetha Basu. The film revolves around family issues.

Cast 
Krisshna as Krishna
Swetha Basu as Meera
Radha
Manobala

Release 
A critic from The Times of India gave the film a rating of one-and-a-half out of five stars and noted that "The feeling you are left with in the end is that of having watched eight episodes of a mega serial on the big screen without a break". A critic from Behindwoods gave the film the same rating and noted that "But, he [Krishna] could not avoid the overpowering sense of drama, which almost lulls you at times". Critics from Maalaimalar and Dinamalar criticised the film. A critic from Filmibeat praised the film's story.

References

2012 films
2012 romantic drama films
Indian romantic drama films
2010s Tamil-language films